Mountains in Denali National Park and Preserve are part of the Alaska Range, with several subsidiary ranges included within the overall Alaska Range. Denali (also known as Mount McKinley), is the highest peak in the park and the highest peak in North America at  The names listed here reflect the official names in the USGS U.S. Board on Geographic Names database. They in most cases exclude subsidiary peaks of larger mountains — McKinley alone has dozens of prominent points above 15,000 feet. The final version of this list will include all named peaks in the park and preserve above  and a selection of prominent named peaks of lesser height.

Central Alaska Range
The central Alaska Range is dominated by the enormous Mount McKinley and its complex of subsidiary summits, spurs and buttresses. Of the other central Alaska Range summits, only Mount Foraker substantially exceeds , and most prominent peaks are in the  –  range.

 Denali - ; 
 Kahiltna Dome - ; 
 Kahiltna Peaks - ; 
 The Mooses Tooth - ; 
 Mount Brooks - ; 
 Mount Capps - ; 
 Mount Carpe - ; 
 Mount Church - ; 
 Mount Crosson - ; 
 Mount Dall - ; 
 Mount Dan Beard - ; 
 Mount Deception - ; 
 Mount Eldridge - ; 
 Mount Foraker - ; 
 Mount Hayes - ; 
 Mount Hunter - ; 
 Mount Huntington - ; 
 Mount Koven - ; 
 Mount Mather - ; 
 Mount Pendleton - ; 
 Mount Russell - ; 
 Mount Silverthrone - ; 
 Mount Tatum - ; 
 Mount Tripyramid - ; 
 Wedge Peak - ;

Kichatna Mountains
The Kichatna Mountains are a sub-range to the west of the central Alaska Range, notable for a complex of glacial arêtes that are collectively called the Cathedral Spires.

 Augustin Peak - ; 
 Gurney Peak - ; 
 Kichatna Spire - ; 
 Lewis Peak - ;

Alaska Range north of the Denali Park Road
The Alaska Range continues northeastward from the Denali massif, becoming lower north of the main park road.

 Polychrome Mountain - ;

Kantishna Hills
 Brooker Mountain

Primrose Ridge
 Mount Margaret
 Mount Wright

Further reading

Notes

Mountains
Lists of mountain ranges of the United States
Denali